The following is a list of the 19 cantons of the Drôme department, in France, following the French canton reorganisation which came into effect in March 2015:

 Bourg-de-Péage
 Crest
 Dieulefit
 Le Diois
 Drôme des collines
 Grignan
 Loriol-sur-Drôme
 Montélimar-1
 Montélimar-2
 Nyons et Baronnies
 Romans-sur-Isère
 Saint-Vallier
 Tain-l'Hermitage
 Le Tricastin
 Valence-1
 Valence-2
 Valence-3
 Valence-4
 Vercors-Monts du Matin

References